Ravenloft has acted as the official campaign setting for multiple Dungeons & Dragons roleplaying adventure modules, sourcebooks and accessories. It has also been the main setting for novels and video games.

Roleplaying products by TSR

Roleplaying products by Sword & Sorcery Studios

Roleplaying products by Wizards of the Coast

Novels and comics 
A number of tie-in novels and comics were released, set in the Demiplane of Dread:

References

Dungeons & Dragons books
Dungeons & Dragons modules
Lists about role-playing games
Ravenloft